The List of notable addresses in Beacon Hill, Boston contains information, by street, of significant buildings and the people who lived in the community. Many of the street names have changed. For instance, Phillips street was once called Southack Street.

Current and former street names

 Anderson Street – West Centre Street
 Bowdoin Street – Middlecott Street
 Bulfinch Street
 Court Street – Prison Lane, then Queen Street
 Howard – Southack's Court (after Capt. Cyprian Southack)
 Irving Street – Butolph Street
 Joy Street
 Clapboard Street (between Cambridge and Myrtle Streets in 1735)
 Belknap Lane (between Myrtle and Mount Vernon Streets)
 Mt. Vernon Street – Sumner
 Phillips Street – Southack Street (after Capt. Cyprian Southack)
 Revere Street – May Street
 Smith Court – May's Court
 State Street – King Street
 Tremont – Common (NE of School Street where Beacon Street ends)
 West Cedar Street – George Street

Notable addresses in Beacon Hill

Beacon Street

Beacon Street is a main thoroughfare from the Tremont Street and School Street intersection to Charles Street. Hancock Manor was located at 30 Beacon Street; Its land is now part of the grounds of the Massachusetts State House.
 One Beacon Street – An eponymous office tower at the corner of Tremont Street; the 14th-tallest building in the city
 8 Beacon Street – late 19th- and early 20th-century home of the Osgood Family: Dr. Osgood, Margaret Osgood and daughters Gretchen and Mary
 10½ Beacon Street – Boston Athenæum
 14 Beacon Street – Congregational House, site of the Congregational Library and City Mission Society
 16 Beacon Street – Chester Harding House, now home to the Boston Bar Association, was home to the famous portrait painter Chester Harding from 1826–1830
 22 Beacon Street – Amory-Ticknor House, built in 1804 by Charles Bulfinch; used to house the Beacon Hill studio for Fox 25 News (WFXT), with a strategic rooftop camera position
 24 Beacon Street – Massachusetts State House
 25 Beacon Street – former headquarters of the Unitarian Universalist Association, an international liberal religious denomination, which is now located at 24 Farnsworth Street
 33 Beacon Street – resident George Parkman; building designed by Cornelius Coolidge
 34½ Beacon Street – erstwhile headquarters of Family Service of Greater Boston, a private, nonprofit social service agency founded in 1835
 39–40 Beacon Street – Henry Wadsworth Longfellow courted and married Fanny Appleton
 42–43 Beacon Street – painter John Singleton Copley had a house on this site, as did David Sears II, whose house is now the home of the Somerset Club
 45 Beacon Street – Third Harrison Gray Otis House, now American Meteorological Society
 57 Beacon Street - Thomas J. Eckley house, Ephraim Marsh, architect (1819). Notable as town residence of George Nixon Black, Jr., also owner of Kragsyde, iconic Shingle Style cottage and Woodlawn Museum, his Asher Benjamin ancestral home in Maine. Black was a major benefactor of the Museum of Fine Arts, Boston. 
 54–55 Beacon Street – resident William H. Prescott had William Makepeace Thackeray as a houseguest. The pair of buildings is now the Headquarters House
 84 Beacon Street – Cheers Beacon Hill. Formerly known as the Bull & Finch Pub, this pub was the inspiration for the classic television show, Cheers, and was shown during the opening credits of the sitcom.

Bowdoin Street
 
Located near the West End, Bowdoin Street extends from the top of Beacon Street, down Beacon Hill to Cambridge Street

 35 Bowdoin Street – Church of Saint John the Evangelist
 122 Bowdoin Street – nominal resident, John Fitzgerald Kennedy (registered voting address)

Brimmer Street
 30 Brimmer Street – Church of the Advent (official site)
 44 Brimmer Street – resident Samuel Eliot Morison

Cambridge Street

 Massachusetts General Hospital – Bulfinch Pavilion and Ether Dome
 100 Cambridge Street, Upper Plaza – Garden of Peace
 131 Cambridge Street – Old West Church
 141 Cambridge Street – First Harrison Gray Otis House, architect Charles Bulfinch

Charles Street
Running north to south, Charles Street runs through the middle of Boston.
 44A Charles Street – Mary Sullivan, last victim of the Boston Strangler, murdered here
 70 Charles Street – Charles Street Meeting House

Chestnut Street

 2 Chestnut Street – held the Garland Junior College from 1872 to 1976
 6 Chestnut Street – Beacon Hill Friends House
 13, 15, 17 Chestnut Street – architect Charles Bulfinch designed row-houses for Hepzibah Swan
 18 Chestnut Street – birthplace of poet Robert Lowell
 50 Chestnut Street – resident Francis Parkman, historian; building designed by Cornelius Coolidge
 57A Chestnut Street – Harvard Musical Association

Grove Street
 28 Grove Street – resident Rev. Leonard A. Grimes, prominent black clergyman associated with the Underground Railroad and abolitionist movement. Noted for being one of the men who bought the freedom of Anthony Burns after his arrest.

Irving Street
 58 Irving Street – birthplace of Charles Sumner, abolitionist, U.S. Senator.

Joy Street

 46 Joy Street – African Meeting House
 60 Joy Street – Peter Faneuil School
 67 Joy Street – resident Rebecca Lee Crumpler, prominent physician, considered to be the first black woman to receive a medical degree in the U.S.

Louisburg Square
Named for the Siege of Louisbourg, the square is a private park and the name of the area around it.
 4 Louisburg Square – resident William Dean Howells while editor of the Atlantic Monthly
 10 Louisburg Square – residents Amos Bronson Alcott and Louisa May Alcott and family
 19 Louisburg Square – residents John Kerry and Teresa Heinz Kerry
 20 Louisburg Square – singer Jenny Lind married Otto Goldschmidt here

Mount Vernon Street

 5 Mount Vernon Street – former site of Dr. Park's "Boston Lyceum for the Education of Young Ladies"
 8 Mount Vernon Street – home of Fiske Warren and Gretchen Osgood Warren
 32 Mount Vernon Street – residents Dr. Samuel Gridley Howe and his wife Julia Ward Howe
 41 Mount Vernon Street – home of Beacon Press, a department of the Unitarian Universalist Association, that published the Senator Mike Gravel edition of the Pentagon Papers in 1971, which is now located at 24 Farnsworth Street. Former home of the Watch and Ward Society
 45–47 Mount Vernon Street – site of Portia School of Law, founded for women in 1908
 51–57 Mount Vernon Street – architect Charles Bulfinch
 55 Mount Vernon Street – home of Rose Standish Nichols, now the Nichols House Museum
 57 Mount Vernon Street – residents Daniel Webster and later Charles Francis Adams
 67 Mount Vernon Street – home of Samuel Dennis and Susan Cornelia Warren, paper manufacturer and one time president of the Museum of Fine Arts, Boston
 72 Mount Vernon Street – site of the Boston University School of Theology
 76 Mount Vernon Street – home of Margaret Deland
 77 Mount Vernon Street – resident Sarah Wyman Whitman and later the clubhouse of the Club of Odd Volumes
 85 Mount Vernon Street – Second Harrison Gray Otis House, architect Charles Bulfinch
 87 Mount Vernon Street – Colonial Society of Massachusetts, architect Charles Bulfinch
 127 Mount Vernon Street – home of The Real World: Boston and Spenser: For Hire, former Boston Fire Department station

Myrtle Street
 109 Myrtle Street – resident Lysander Spooner, an American individualist anarchist.

Park Street
Park Street is a small but notable road.
 8 Park Street – Union Club of Boston
 Park Street District

Phillips Street
Formerly known as Southack Court, after the owner Cyprian Southack 
 2 Phillips Street – Resident John Coburn
 18 Phillips Street – The Vilna Shul, now Boston's Center For Jewish Culture
 41 Phillips Street – Erstwhile site of the Northeast Institute of Industrial Technology
 66 Phillips Street – Lewis and Harriet Hayden House, associated with the Abolitionist movement and the Underground Railroad
 83 Phillips Street – Resident John Sweat Rock, prominent black dentist, attorney, and abolitionist activist

Pinckney Street
 15 Pinckney Street – a site of Elizabeth Peabody's Kindergarten
 86 Pinckney Street – home of abolitionist, and state legislator John J. Smith
 105 Pinckney Street – Resident P.P.F. Degrand

Smith Court

 3 Smith Court – residence of William Cooper Nell, African American abolitionist, author and historian

Tremont Street
Tremont Street is a main thoroughfare; Its name evolved from trimount including Beacon Hill, Mount Vernon and Pemberton Hill. Beacon Theatre was once located at 47–53 Tremont Street.

Other residents
 Writers Brad Meltzer and Judd Winick lived in a tiny apartment in Beacon Hill in 1993 before they achieved success. While living there, Winick developed his first successful comic strip and Meltzer worked at Games Magazine by day while working on his first novel at night.

References

External links
 Beacon Hill History
 Beacon Hill Online
 Black Beacon Hill
 Vilna Shul
 Back Bay – Beacon Hill 2000 Census of Population and Housing
 Beacon Hill Quick-Walk
 Metropolitan Museum of Art. First Methodist Church, Temple Street, Beacon Hill, Boston, c. 1930. Photo by Walker Evans.

Λ
Λ
Historic preservation in the United States
Λ
Λ